Dragor Hill (‘Halm Dragor’ \'h&lm 'dra-gor\) is the hill rising to 767 m east of Whitecloud Glacier on Trinity Peninsula, Antarctic Peninsula. It is named after the settlement of Dragor in southern Bulgaria.

Location
German-British mapping in 1996.

Maps
 Trinity Peninsula. Scale 1:250000 topographic map No. 5697. Institut für Angewandte Geodäsie and British Antarctic Survey, 1996.
 Antarctic Digital Database (ADD). Scale 1:250000 topographic map of Antarctica. Scientific Committee on Antarctic Research (SCAR). Since 1993, regularly upgraded and updated.

Notes

References
 Bulgarian Antarctic Gazetteer. Antarctic Place-names Commission. (details in Bulgarian, basic data in English)
 Dragor Hill. SCAR Composite Antarctic Gazetteer

External links
 Dragor Hill. Copernix satellite image

 Hills of Trinity Peninsula
 Bulgaria and the Antarctic